The Melodi Grand Prix Junior 2012 was Norway's eleventh national Melodi Grand Prix Junior for young singers aged 8 to 15. It was held in Oslo Spektrum, Oslo, Norway and broadcast live Norwegian Broadcasting Corporation (NRK). It was hosted by Margrethe Røed and Tooji, the winner of Norwegian Melodi Grand Prix 2012.

The winner was the duo Marcus & Martinus with the song "To dråper vann" (Norwegian for Two drops of water). The song proved to be a hit and was included on their debut album Hei

The album Melodi Grand Prix Junior 2012 containing the songs of the finals reached No. 2 on the VG-lista Norwegian Albums Chart on weeks 36 of 2012 staying at No. 2 for just one week.

Results

First round

Super Final
The exact number of public votes was unknown. Only the winner was announced.

References

External links
Official website

Melodi Grand Prix Junior
Music festivals in Norway